Gaston is a masculine given name of French origin and a surname. The name "Gaston" may refer to:

People

First name
Gaston I, Count of Foix (1287–1315)
Gaston II, Count of Foix (1308–1343)
Gaston III, Count of Foix (1331–1391)
Gaston IV, Count of Foix (1422–1472)
Gaston I, Viscount of Béarn (died circa 980)
Gaston II, Viscount of Béarn (circa 951 – 1012)
Gaston III, Viscount of Béarn (died on or before 1045)
Gaston IV, Viscount of Béarn (died 1131)
Gaston V, Viscount of Béarn (died 1170)
Gaston VI, Viscount of Béarn (1173–1214)
Gaston VII, Viscount of Béarn (1225–1290)
Gaston of Foix, Prince of Viana (1444–1470)
Gaston, Count of Marsan (1721–1743)
Gaston, Duke of Orléans (1608–1660), French nobleman
Gaston Bachelard (1884–1962), French philosopher
Gaston Balande (1880–1971), French painter and illustrator
Gaston Browne (born 1967), Antiguan politician and Prime Minister
Gaston Caperton (born 1940), American politician
Gaston Chevrolet (1892–1920), French racecar driver and automobile manufacturer
Gaston Cornereau (1888–1944), French fencer
Gaston Couté (1880–1911), French poet and singer
Gaston d'Orléans (1842–1922), French prince and military commander
Gaston de Foix, Count of Candale (1448–1500), French nobleman
Gastón de Peralta (1510–1587), Spanish nobleman
Gaston Defferre (1910–1986), French politician
Gaston Doumergue (1863–1937), French politician and President
Gastón Etlis (born 1974), Argentinian tennis player
Gaston Eyskens (1905–1988), Belgian politician and Prime Minister
Gaston Flosse (born 1931), French Polynesian politician and President
Gaston Gallimard (1881–1975), French publisher
Gastón Gaudio (born 1978), Argentinian tennis player
Gaston Glock (born 1929), Austrian engineer
Gaston Gradis (1889–1968), French businessman and explorer
Gaston Julia (1893–1978), French mathematician
Gaston Leroux (1868–1927), French writer
Gaston Monnerville (1897–1991), French politician
Gaston Michel  (1856–1921), French actor
Gaston Palewski (1901–1984), French politician
Gaston Paris (1839–1903), French writer
Gastón Ramírez (born 1990), Uruguayan footballer
Gaston Rébuffat (1921–1985), French alpinist
Gaston Salmon (1878–1917), Belgian Olympic champion fencer
Gastón Solnicki (born 1978), Argentine film director
Gaston Thorn (1928–2007), Luxembourg politician and Prime Minister
Gaston Tong Sang (born 1949), French Polynesian politician and President

Surname
A. G. Gaston (1892–1996), American businessman
Bill Gaston (born 1953), Canadian writer
Cito Gaston (born 1944), American baseball player and manager
Fannie Gaston-Johansson (born 1938), American professor of nursing
Hugo Gaston (born 2000), French tennis player
Iñaki Gastón (born 1963), Spanish cyclist
Isis Gaston (born 2000), American rapper known as Ice Spice
Joe Gaston (born 1926), British politician
Joseph P. Gaston (1833–1913), American railroad executive
Justin Gaston (born 1988), American singer-songwriter and actor
Lloyd Gaston (1929–2006), Canadian theologian and professor 
Mack C. Gaston (born 1940), Admiral United States Navy, First Black Admiral NTC Great Lakes, member of the Secretary of the Navy's Advisory Subcommittee on Naval History
Marilyn Gaston (born 1939), American physician
Michael Gaston (born 1962), American actor
Nicola Gaston (born 1980), New Zealand scientist
Victor Gaston (born 1943), American politician
William Gaston (1778–1844), American politician and jurist
William Gaston (Massachusetts politician) (1820–1894), American politician
William H. Gaston (1840–1927), American landowner
Yves Gaston (1806–1863), French-Filipino businessman

Fictional
Gaston Lagaffe, fictional character in the Gaston comics by André Franquin
Gaston, fictional character in Colette's 1944 novella Gigi
Gaston, the main antagonist in the 1991 film Beauty and the Beast and its 2017 remake
Gaston the Ladybird, a fictional character in Ben & Holly's Little Kingdom
Gaston, one of the main characters from the Alphonse and Gaston comic strip
Gaston, a rabbit villager in the video game series Animal Crossing

See also
Gaston (disambiguation)

Masculine given names
French masculine given names